"We Say Yeah" is a song originally performed by Cliff Richard & The Shadows. It was initially released in December 1961 on "The Young Ones" soundtrack album and a few weeks later the B-side to "The Young Ones" single. Both reached number 1 in their respective UK charts. In France however, it was "We Say Yeah" instead of "The Young Ones" that made the singles chart, reaching number 14.

Johnny Hallyday version ("Dis-moi oui") 

The song was adapted into French (under the title "Dis-moi oui") by Ralph Bernet and Claude Carrère and recorded by French singer Johnny Hallyday. He included it on his 1963 album Johnny Hallyday (commonly known as Les Bras en croix) and also released on the EP "Les Bras en croix".

Track listing 
Les bras en croix, 7" EP Philips 432.908 BE (1963, France, Spain, etc.)

A1. "Les bras en croix" (2:13)
A2. "Quitte-moi doucement" ("Break It to Me Gently") (2:30)
B1. "Quand un air vous possède" ("When My Little Girl Is Smiling") (2:17)
B2. "Dis-moi oui" ("We Say Yeah") (2:07)

Charts

References

External links 
 Johnny Hallyday — Les Bras en croix (EP) on Discogs

1962 songs
1963 singles
Cliff Richard songs
Johnny Hallyday songs
Columbia Records singles
Philips Records singles
Songs written by Hank Marvin
Songs written by Bruce Welch